Ernest Clifford Price (13 June 1900 – 30 July 1959) was an English footballer who played at inside left for various clubs in the 1920s.

Football career
Price was born at Market Bosworth, Leicestershire and, after playing as a teenager for Coalville Swifts in the Leicestershire Senior League, joined Leicester Fosse as a trainee in January 1917. After spending a period back with Coalville Swifts on loan, he signed as a professional in October 1920. Price spent a further two seasons with Leicester before transferring to Halifax Town in June 1922.

In December 1923, Price joined Southampton, immediately taking over from Len Andrews in the No.10 shirt. His debut came when he replaced Henry Johnson in a 2–1 victory at South Shields on 22 December 1923, Saints' first away win of the season. Price was described in the local press as "an inside-left of the studious type", whose passes were usually well-judged. He immediately struck up an understanding with his left-wing partner Jimmy Carr before, in January, injury put Carr out of the game for the rest of the season, with Elias MacDonald replacing him.

Price missed only two league matches for the remainder of the 1923–24 season, but missed the start of the following season, with new signing Stan Woodhouse being preferred by manager Jimmy McIntyre. Price regained his place after the first six games and on his recall linked up briefly with his nephew Fred Price who had recently been signed from Leicester City, before Carr returned to the side in November.
 
Midway through the 1925–26 season Price lost his place to Frank Matthews and at the end of the season returned to the Midlands to join Nottingham Forest.

After two seasons with Forest, Price dropped down to non-league football in October 1928 with Loughborough Corinthians and Nuneaton Town.

Family
His nephew, Fred's brother Jack was also a footballer with Leicester City, Bristol Rovers, Swindon Town and Torquay United.

References

1900 births
1959 deaths
People from Market Bosworth
Footballers from Leicestershire
English footballers
Association football inside forwards
Coalville Swifts F.C. players
Leicester City F.C. players
Halifax Town A.F.C. players
Southampton F.C. players
Nottingham Forest F.C. players
Loughborough Corinthians F.C. players
Nuneaton Borough F.C. players
English Football League players